Maroantsetra Airport is an airport in Maroantsetra, Analanjirofo Region, Madagascar .

Airlines and destinations

References

Airports in Madagascar
Analanjirofo